Legendary Songs of Don McLean is a compilation album by Don McLean. The album was released on March 25, 2003.

Track listing 
 Words and Music - 3:05
 American Pie - 8:33
 Since I Don't Have You - 2:35
 Maybe Baby - 2:23
 Crying - 3:49
 Castles in the Air - 3:43
 If I Only Had a Match - 4:40
 Your Cheatin' Heart - 3:04
 And I Love You So - 4:16
 Vincent - 4:00
 Winterwood - 3:10
 If We Try - 3:35
 Everyday - 2:26
 Wonderful Baby - 2:05
 Crossroads - 3:39
 Jerusalem - 3:43
 Dreidel - 3:47
 Headroom - 4:12
 Have You Seen Me - 4:25
 Just to Hold My Hand - 2:26
 Empty Chairs - 3:26

2003 compilation albums
Don McLean compilation albums